This is a list of holidays in Maldives.
 January 1 New Year's Day
 May 1 Labour Day
 July 26 Independence Day
 November 3 Victory Day
 November 11 Republic Day

Dates set by the Islamic calendar
 Ramadan
 Eid al-Fitr
 Hajj Day
 Eid al-Adha
 Islamic New Year
 National Day (Qaumee Dhuvas)
 Birth of the Prophet
 The Day Maldives Embraced Islam

References 

Maldivian culture
Society of the Maldives
Maldives
Maldives